Shakti Chattopadhyay (25 November 1933 – 23 March 1995) was an Indian poet and writer who wrote in Bengali. He is known for his realistic depictions of rural life. He was a green poet, many of his poems raised the issue of nature in crisis. Through his poems he urged to protect Mother Nature and plant trees.

The huge surprise and controversy surrounding his poetry have repeatedly moved the readers. The omnipotent humanity of the American Beatniks moved him at one time.

Early life
Shakti Chattopadhyay was born in Jaynagar, to Bamanath Chattopadhyay and Kamala Devi. He lost his father at the age of four and was brought up by his maternal grandfather. He passed Matriculation Examination in 1951 and got admitted to the City College to study commerce as his maternal uncle, who was a businessman and also his guardian, promised him a job of an accountant. In 1953, he passed Intermediate Commerce Examination, but gave up studying commerce and got admitted to the Presidency College (now Presidency University, Kolkata) with Honours in Bengali literature but he did not appear in the examination.

Shakti Chattopadhyay worked with Ananda Bazar Patrika from 1970 to 1994, and was a visiting professor at Visva Bharati University after his retirement.

Literature Career
He started writing novels to make a living from literature. Kuyotala was his first novel. His first collection of poems, Hey prem, Hey naishyabda (O love, O silence), published in 1956. Abani Bari Achho is a poem by Shakti Chattopadhyay. It is included in his seminal early collection Dhôrmeo achho jirafeo achho published in 1965. He also published 10 novels, several collections of travel writing, a collection of essays and Bengali translations.

Notable works
Kuyotala
Hey prem, Hey naishyabda (O love, O silence)
Jwalanta Rumal 
Āmāke jāgāo
Dhôrmeo achho jirafeo achho :     Abani Bari Achho
Jete Pari Kintu Keno Jabo
Padyasamagra
Sakale pratyeke ekā
Kabira galpa
Agranthita padya
Sandhyāra se-śānta upahāra

Awards
Ananda Puraskar
Sahitya Akademi Award

References

 Writers from Kolkata

External links
   
 
 Shakti Chattopadhyay Section at parabaas.com
 Complete, chronological bibliography of Shakti Chattopadhyay (in Bengali)
 Selected Poems of Shakti Chattopadhya

1934 births
1995 deaths
Indian male writers
Indian male poets
Bengali poets
Bengali-language writers
Bengali male poets
Bengali Hindus
Recipients of the Sahitya Akademi Award in Bengali
Recipients of the Gangadhar National Award
Recipients of the Ananda Purashkar
City College, Kolkata alumni
University of Calcutta alumni
Academic staff of Visva-Bharati University
Translators of Omar Khayyám
Hungry generation
20th-century Indian translators
20th-century Indian poets
20th-century Bengali poets
20th-century translators

People from South 24 Parganas district 
Poets from West Bengal
People from Jaynagar Majilpur